Daniello Solaro (circa 1649–1726) was an Italian sculptor of the Baroque period. He was active in Genoa and France. He trained under the Genoese artist Domenico Parodi.

References

1640s births
1726 deaths
17th-century Genoese people
18th-century Genoese people
17th-century Italian sculptors
18th-century Italian sculptors
Italian male sculptors
Italian Baroque sculptors
Artists from Genoa
18th-century Italian male artists